Koovi is a village in Saaremaa Parish, Saare County in western Estonia.

In the early 1990s there was a maoist community in the village, where a Finnish punk musician Jore Vastelin lived in until his death in 1993.

Before the administrative reform in 2017, the village was in Lääne-Saare Parish.

References

Villages in Saare County